Major-General Sir Edward Maxwell Perceval  (13 August 1861 – 26 November 1955) was a British Army officer.

Military career
Educated at Royal Academy, Gosport and the Royal Military Academy, Woolwich, Perceval was commissioned into the Royal Artillery on 19 May 1880. He saw action in the Second Boer War for which he was appointed a Companion of the Distinguished Service Order. He became Commander, Royal Artillery for 2nd Infantry Division in April 1914, and deployed to France with the British Expeditionary Force in August 1914 at the start of the First World War. He became General Officer Commanding the 49th (West Riding) Infantry Division, which was also engaged on the Western Front, in July 1915 and, after falling ill, returned to the UK to become General Officer Commanding the 68th (2nd Welsh) Division in December 1917. After that he became Commander of the troops at Shorncliffe Army Camp in 1919.

Family
In 1894 he married Marian Bowles; they had one son. After his first wife died in 1896, he married Norah Mayne in 1906; they had one son and one daughter.

References

|-

1861 births
1955 deaths
British Army generals of World War I
Knights Commander of the Order of the Bath
Companions of the Distinguished Service Order
Royal Artillery officers
British Army personnel of the Second Boer War
Graduates of the Royal Military Academy, Woolwich